Calypte is a genus of hummingbirds. It consists of two species found in western North America.

Taxonomy
The genus Calypte was introduced in 1856 by the English ornithologist John Gould. The type species was subsequently designated as Costa's hummingbird. Gould did not explain the derivation of the genus name but it is probably from the Ancient Greek kaluptrē meaning "woman’s veil" or "head-dress" (from kaluptō meaning "to cover"). The genus now contains two species.

Species

References 

"National Geographic". Field Guide to the Birds of North America.  .

 
Hummingbirds
Bird genera